Felicia Frick (born 13 November 2003) is a Liechtensteiner footballer who plays as a midfielder for Vorderland and the Liechtenstein national football team.

Career statistics

International

References

2003 births
Living people
Women's association football midfielders
Liechtenstein women's international footballers
Liechtenstein women's footballers
Liechtenstein expatriate women's footballers
Expatriate women's footballers in Austria